The Design 1029 ship (full name Emergency Fleet Corporation Design 1029) was a steel-hulled passenger/cargo ship designed to be converted in times of war to a troopship. design approved for production by the United States Shipping Boards Emergency Fleet Corporation (EFT) in World War I. They were referred to as the 535-type as all the ships were 535 feet overall length. A total of 10 ships were ordered and built from 1921 to 1922. An additional six ships, originally contracted as Design 1095 ships, were changed during building so they were identical to the Design 1029 ships. Three shipyards built the ships: Bethlehem Sparrows Point Shipyard of Baltimore, Maryland (5 ships); Newport News Shipbuilding & Drydock Company of Newport News, Virginia (5 ships); and New York Shipbuilding Company of Camden, New Jersey (which built the six former Design 1095 ships).

References

Bibliography

External links
 EFC Design 1029: Illustrations

Standard ship types of the United States
Design 1029 ships
Design 1029 ships of the United States Navy
Design 1029 ships of the United States Army